Marco Brenner (born 27 August 2002) is a German professional racing cyclist, who currently rides for UCI WorldTeam .

Major results

Road

2019
 National Junior Road Championships
1st  Time trial
1st  Road race
 1st  Overall Tour du Pays de Vaud
1st  Young rider classification
1st Prologue, Stages 1 & 2a
 1st  Overall Oberösterreich Juniorenrundfahrt
1st  Young rider classification
1st  Mountains classification
1st Stage 3
 1st GP Général Patton
 2nd Overall LVM Saarland Trofeo
1st  Young rider classification
1st Stage 3b (TTT)
 3rd  Time trial, UCI Junior Road World Championships
 3rd Trofeo Emilio Paganessi
 5th Road race, UEC European Junior Road Championships
 5th Overall Course de la Paix Juniors
1st  Young rider classification
 7th GP Luxembourg
 8th Overall Giro della Lunigiana
1st  Points classification
1st Stages 1, 2b (ITT) & 4
2020
 National Junior Road Championships
1st  Time trial
1st  Road race
 UEC European Junior Road Championships
2nd  Time trial
4th Road race
 4th Overall Grand Prix Rüebliland
1st Stage 2b (ITT)

Grand Tour general classification results timeline

Cyclo-cross
2017–2018
 2nd National Debutants Championships
2018–2019
 2nd National Junior Championships
2019–2020
 1st  National Junior Championships
 6th World Junior Championships

References

External links

2002 births
Living people
German male cyclists
Cyclists from Berlin